The GM Futurliners were a group of custom vehicles, styled in the 1940s by Harley Earl for General Motors, and integral to the company's Parade of Progress—a North American traveling exhibition promoting future cars and technologies. Having earlier used eight custom Streamliners from 1936 to 1940, GM sponsored the Parade of Progress and the Futurliners from 1940 to 1941 and again from 1953 to 1956.

At 33 feet long, 8 feet wide, more than 11 feet tall, and weighing more than 12 tons, each Futurliner featured heavily stylized art deco, streamlined bodywork, deep red side and white roof paint, large articulated chrome side panels, a military-grade 302 cubic inch GMC straight-six gasoline engine and automatic transmission, whitewall tires and a prominent, high-mounted, centrally located driver command position with a panoramic windshield.

Of the twelve original Futurliners, one was destroyed in a 1956 accident, and nine survive as of 2007.

In 2014, Futurliner #10 was nominated for inclusion in the National Historic Vehicle Register.

Parade of Progress
Originally manufactured for the 1939 New York World's Fair, the Futurliners were later featured in GM's Parade of Progress, a promotional caravan travelling a 150-stop route across the United States and Canada.   The Futurliners, along with 32 support vehicles, were driven by 50 college graduates, who also staffed the exhibitions along the route.

Typically arranged at each stop around a large tent and an information kiosk, each Futurliner featured a self-contained stage as well as a prominent deployable light tower, and each vehicle featured a particular subject.  The mobile exhibition covered such topics as jet engine technology, agriculture, traffic engineering, stereophonic sound, microwave ovens, television and other innovations. In 1955 a miniature automobile assembly line display named A Car Is Born was constructed for one of the Futurliners. A display titled Our American Crossroads was also used in 1955. This display was narrated by Parker Fennelly and featured a complicated animated diorama that transformed to show progress in road and infrastructure improvements from 1902 to 1953.

Interrupted by World War II, the vehicles were refurbished by GM and the Parade of Progress resumed in 1953. The reborn parade was discontinued in 1956 for the last time, displaced by increasing popularity of network television—one of the very technologies the Futurliners themselves had once promoted.

List of Futurliners 

The following table lists the original displays and the current status of the units.  The three vehicles listed as unknown under Fate does not mean that they no longer exist but rather that the identity of some of the existing Futurliners has not been matched to their original display.  Changes in some of the displays also makes it difficult to trace the lineage of some of the buses.

There are still two Futurliners unaccounted for.

See also 

 List of buses

References

External links

The GM Futurliner Restoration Project
The General Motors Futurliner: A History

Buses of the United States
Cab over vehicles
Futureliner
Historic American Engineering Record in Indiana
Streamliners